Vittorio Emanuele is a station on Line A of the Rome Metro.  The station was inaugurated in 1980 and is sited underground, beneath Piazza Vittorio Emanuele II, which gives it its name, in the Esquilino rione.

The atrium of the station houses several mosaics from the Artemetro Roma Prize. The mosaics on display are by Nicola Carrino and Giulia Napoleone.

On 17 October 2006 there was a train crash in this station, killing one and injuring over 200 people.

Located nearby
Piazza Vittorio Emanuele II
Auditorium of Maecenas
Basilica di Santa Maria Maggiore
Teatro Ambra Jovinelli
Temple of Minerva Medica (nymphaeum)
Santa Croce in Gerusalemme
Porta Maggiore and the underground basilica of Porta Maggiore
Tomb of Eurysaces the Baker
Basilica di Santa Prassede
Museo Nazionale d'Arte Orientale
Capolinea Roma-Pantano
Via Gioberti
Via Merulana
Mercato Vittorio

External links

The station on the ATAC site. 

Rome Metro Line A stations
Railway stations opened in 1980
1980 establishments in Italy
Rome R. XV Esquilino
Railway stations in Italy opened in the 20th century